A select committee is a committee made up of a small number of parliamentary members appointed to deal with particular areas or issues originating in the Westminster system of parliamentary democracy. Select committees exist in the British Parliament, as well as in other parliaments based on the Westminster model, such as those in Australia, Canada, Malaysia, India, Sri Lanka and New Zealand.

It is a special subcommittee of a legislature or assembly governed under a committee system, like Robert's Rules of Order. They are often investigative in nature, collecting data or evidence for a law or problem, and will dissolve immediately after they report their findings to their superiors.

These are very common in government legislatures, and are used to solve special problems, hence their name.

Australia

India
Under Rule 125 of the Rajya Sabha Rules and Procedures, any member may move as an amendment that a bill be referred to a select committee and, if the motion is carried, the bill shall be referred to such a committee. The House decides the members of such committee.

Ireland

Sri Lanka
Parliament will appoint ad-hoc committees to inquire into and report to the House on a particular matter.

New Zealand

United Kingdom

See also 
 Select committee (disambiguation)
 Special prosecutor
 Select or special committee (United States Congress)

References 

 
Political terminology
Government commissions